Anita Álvarez (born December 2, 1996) is an American artistic and synchronized swimmer. Originally from Buffalo, New York, she attended Kenmore West Senior High School, from which she graduated in 2014. She began her professional synchronized swimming career after she graduated.

Career 
Álvarez competed in the women's duet at the 2016 Summer Olympics with Mariya Koroleva, finishing 9th. She is a member of the USA Synchronized Swimming National Team. She competed at the 2015 World Championships in Kazan and at the 2014 Junior World Championships.

Previously, Álvarez coached intramural swimming in Western New York. As coach for Walnut Creek Aquanuts, she saw them to the 2019 Junior Olympics in Buffalo, New York.

She qualified to represent the United States at the 2020 Summer Olympics in the women's duet, alongside Lindi Schroeder. The pair finished 13th in their preliminary, failing to advance to the final.

She was named USA Synchro Athlete of the Year along with Mariya Koroleva in 2016 and in 2019. She was also named USA's Artistic Swimming Athlete of the Year in 2021.

At the end of her solo free routine at the 2022 World Aquatics Championships in Budapest on June 22, Álvarez fainted in the pool and sank to the bottom. Her coach Andrea Fuentes jumped into the pool to rescue her and she received medical attention afterward. FINA subsequently barred her from participating in the team free routine final on June 24. Álvarez had previously fainted during the FINA Olympic Qualification Tournament in Barcelona in June 2021, also being rescued by Fuentes on that occasion.

References

External Links 
Special Edition: Anita Alvarez Interview

1996 births
Living people
American synchronized swimmers
Olympic synchronized swimmers of the United States
Synchronized swimmers at the 2016 Summer Olympics
Synchronized swimmers at the 2020 Summer Olympics
Pan American Games medalists in synchronized swimming
Pan American Games bronze medalists for the United States
Synchronized swimmers at the 2015 Pan American Games
Synchronized swimmers at the 2017 World Aquatics Championships
American sportspeople of Mexican descent
Artistic swimmers at the 2019 Pan American Games
Artistic swimmers at the 2019 World Aquatics Championships
Artistic swimmers at the 2022 World Aquatics Championships
Medalists at the 2015 Pan American Games
Medalists at the 2019 Pan American Games
21st-century American women